Kate Yeung is an Hong Kong actress and singer. She was nominated twice for Best Supporting Actress for 20 30 40.

Early life 
On 26 October 1984, Yeung was born as Yeung Mei-ling in Hong Kong.

Career 
At 16, Yeung modeled for Wing Shya, a celebrity photographer. 
In 2002, Yeung's film career started with Mighty Baby, a comedy film directed by Patrick Leung.

Filmography

Film

Television series

References

External links
 
 Kate Yeung on Sina Weibo

1984 births
Living people
Hong Kong film actresses
Hong Kong television actresses
21st-century Hong Kong actresses